Branimir Šćepanović (19 April 1937 – 30 November 2020) was a Serbian and Yugoslav writer.

Biography
His father was a teacher and a published author. Šćepanović started writing during high school. The novel Usta puna zemlje had 32 editions in Serbia and 23 editions in France. He served as artistic director of Avala Film. 

Šćepanović won the October award from the city of Belgrade and two Golden Arenas for Best Screenplay.

Šćepanović's 1977 novel, Smrt gospodina Goluže (The Death of Mr. Goluzha) was adapted in 1997 by Alan Wade for the film he directed, Julian Po. Julian Po starred Christian Slater and Robin Tunney, and was released by Fine Line Features and New Line International.

Works
Books
Pre istine, 1961
Sramno leto, 1965
Usta puna zemlje, 1974
Smrt gospodina Goluže, 1977
Iskupljenje, 1980
Ono drugo vreme, Srpska književna zadruga, 2015

Screenplays
Ono more, 1965
Kljuc, 1965
Pre istine, 1968
Lelejska gora, 1968
Sramno leto, 1969
Kako umreti, 1972
Sutjeska, 1973
Smrt gospodina Goluže, 1982
Vreme leoparda, 1985

See also 
 Serbian literature

References

External links
 The last interview by Šćepanović

1937 births
2020 deaths
Serbs of Montenegro
Serbian novelists
20th-century Serbian people